The 2012 Atlantic 10 Conference men's soccer season was the 26th season for the Conference fielding men's NCAA Division I men's college soccer. Interconference play began on October 5, and continued through November 4. The season culminated with the 2012 Atlantic 10 Men's Soccer Tournament, where the top schools in the conference competed for a guaranteed berth into the 2012 NCAA Division I Men's Soccer Championship.

The defending regular season champions were the national finalists, Charlotte. The defending tournament winners were Xavier.

This was the last men's soccer season for Richmond, which dropped the sport (along with men's track) after announcing it would add men's lacrosse in the near future.

Changes from 2011 
 Butler Bulldogs and VCU Rams join the conference after playing in the Horizon League and Colonial Athletic Association, respectively.

Season outlook

Preseason polls 

Source:

Teams

Stadiums and locations

Standings

A10 Tournament

Results

Statistics 

As of October 8, 2012.

Top scorers

Source:

Top assists

Source:

|}

See also 
 Atlantic 10 Conference
 2012 in American soccer
 2012 NCAA Division I men's soccer season

References 

 
2012 NCAA Division I men's soccer season